Ben Green is a British media and podcast producer, currently head of production for Muddy Knees Media. Green is commonly referred to as ‘Producer Ben’ on air.

Formerly a producer at Channel 4 news and LBC Radio, Green spent 11 years as a multimedia producer at The Guardian. Having joined The Guardian in 2006 he produced the Football Weekly podcast from its inception until 2017, and also produced over 25 Football Weekly live shows, including a show for over 2000 people at the London Palladium.

He has hosted workshops on how to effectively produce podcasts at events held in London and in Dublin, although they proved unpopular. He also produced an e-book called Podcast Master which was also serialised in podcast form. It was generally derided by critics and failed to sell in convincing numbers.

He is now the producer of The Totally Football Show an off-shoot of The Guardian’s Football Weekly from which he, host James Richardson, and regular contributor Iain Macintosh departed in controversial circumstances in order to co-found Muddy Knees Media to create their own product ahead of the start of the 2017-18 football season. The new shows attracted five million downloads in their first two months. As well as the flagship ‘Totally Football Show’, the ‘Totally Football League show’ and ‘Golazo: the Totally Italian football show’ are also weekly football podcasts released co-produced by Audio Boom who reportedly saw their profits increase by 329%  with Muddy Knees media claiming over 500,000 weekly listeners.

Green is co-host of the Parts Unknown , a Muddy Knees media podcast about professional wrestling.

He has also produced Totally Football Live shows held at venues such as the O2 in London.

Personal life
Green has Jewish and Irish heritage and is a supporter of Liverpool F.C.

References

Living people
British podcasters
Year of birth missing (living people)